Arani is a Lok Sabha (Parliament of India) constituency in Tamil Nadu. Its Tamil Nadu Parliamentary Constituency number is 12 of 39. It was created during the 2008 assembly delimitation from the former Vandavasi constituency.

Assembly segments 
Arani constituency is composed of the following assembly segments.

Members of the Parliament

Election results

General Election 2019

General Election 2014

General Election 2009

References

Lok Sabha constituencies in Tamil Nadu